The G450X is an Enduro-class motorcycle that was produced by BMW Motorrad between 2008 and 2011.

Background and Origins
The G450X project originated with BMW Motorrad's desire to capture a portion of the 450 four-stroke enduro class from established manufacturers, including the Japanese big four and KTM.
Following the relatively poor sales achieved by BMW's F650GS-derived G650X Challenge, BMW deduced that the Challenge's lack of market acceptance had been due at least in part to its excessive weight and unconventional suspension. The relatively underpowered Challenge had weighed substantially more than competitors like the KTM 640 Adventure, and its pneumatic rear suspension strut was both unadjustable for compression and rebound damping, and expensive to rebuild.

In marketing terms, BMW Motorrad intended to position the G450X as both an enduro-class motorcycle and a viable dual-sport motorcycle. However, its narrow seat, low fuel capacity, small headlight and lack of wind protection meant this notion was highly questionable. Also, with BMW already producing a variety of dedicated medium-weight dual-sport motorcycles such as the G650GS and twin-cylinder F650GS, the G450X was immediately recognizable as an enduro-only machine.

The design brief for what would become the G450X specified that it should have at least as much power and torque as its established Japanese and Austrian competition, that it should be physically lighter and more compact (thereby also making it easier to ride), and that it should adhere more closely to established design conventions within the 450 four-stroke enduro class. In the process of development, BMW engineers made a number of theoretical improvements on the design baseline established by Kawasaki, Yamaha, Honda, Suzuki and KTM.

The G450X was first presented on 6 November 2007, at the EICMA 2007 trade fair in Milan.

Nomenclature
The G450X’s internal BMW model code is K16.
The motorcycle’s name follows the naming convention for BMW motorcycles. G is a reference to engine series (in this case, single-cylinder). The expected F prefix was re-assigned from single-cylinder to parallel-twin motorcycles with the advent of the F800GS and twin-cylinder F650GS at approximately the same time the single-cylinder F650GS was re-designated the G650GS. 450 is a reference to the engine’s quoted swept volume of 450 cm3. X signifies Cross, referring to BMW Motorrad’s intent to position the G450X as both a dedicated enduro motorcycle and a dual-sport motorcycle.

Frame
Departing from the enduro-class convention of a cradle-style frame in either chrome-molybdenum steel or cast aluminium, the G450X used a bridge-type main frame manufactured in powder-coated stainless steel. The main frame’s lower frame tubes bridge the headstock tube and swingarm pivot in a straight line, yielding maximum rigidity for minimum weight. The steel main frame is complemented by a conventional rectangular-profile aluminium sub-frame.
The size of the engine’s airbox meant that the fuel tank could not be located behind the steering headstock in typical fashion. Instead, the fuel tank is located under the seat, within the confines of the rear sub-frame. The fuel filling arrangement is also unusual, with the fuel filler cap located at the midway point of the seat.

Engine
BMW designed an all-new 449 cm3 four-stroke single-cylinder engine utilizing double overhead camshafts with four valves per cylinder, and a balance shaft to reduce vibration. The engine was manufactured in Taiwan on BMW’s behalf, by Kymco.
Like all modern BMW motorcycle engines, the G450X’s engine features automotive-style closed-loop fuel injection. The engine also features integrated coil-over-plug ignition, single fuel injector, exhaust oxygen-content sensor, catalytic convertor and overrun cut-off functionality.

Unusually, the fuel injection/ignition system was not supplied by Bosch, but instead by the Japanese Keihin Corporation. The system is unique to the G450X, and carries BMW designation KMS-K16 (Keihin Management System, applicable to BMW model code K16).

Some technical compromises had to be made to accommodate the G450X’s unusual clutch arrangement. One consequence is that the engine's crankshaft rotates backwards instead of forwards, as is typical. The engine is also angled forward at 30 degrees from the vertical to create space for the larger airbox.

The G450X was sold with a EURO 3 noise and emissions-compliant exhaust system that limits it to approximately 40 BHP.
If a BMW-supplied electronic coding plug is installed, a second competition-oriented engine management map is enabled. If the coding plug is installed in combination with BMW’s G450X-specific Akrapovič competition exhaust muffler, engine power increases to approximately 51 BHP. Connecting the coding plug and/or installing the competition muffler renders the motorcycle not compliant with noise and emissions regulations; therefore, the motorcycle is not road-legal in this configuration.

Clutch
With the design brief specifying both low weight and the improved handling brought by a longer swingarm, the required space was liberated by moving the multi-plate clutch to the right-hand side of the crankshaft. As a consequence, the clutch basket drives the gearbox instead of the other way around. The drive-plate/driven-plate/clutch basket assembly is physically smaller than is typical, and the clutch assembly’s crankshaft mounting partially negates the need for a separate flywheel. Following existing convention, the clutch is cable-operated, and shares the same oil as the engine.

Gearbox
The five-speed claw-shift transmission is integrated with the engine, and has an overall arrangement of gears, shafts and shift forks that was more compact than was typical. The engine and gearbox share a common oil supply. 

On enduro bikes made by established competition, the front drive sprocket is located forward of the swingarm pivot, meaning that drive chain tension changes dynamically according to rear suspension movement. In turn, this means the drive chain must always incorporate a certain amount of slack. BMW solved this problem using its Coaxial Traction system, with the front drive sprocket located at the same rotational axis as the swingarm pivot. This is facilitated by the swingarm’s locating shaft running through a hollow gearbox output shaft. This arrangement allows the drive chain to be run with no slack. This eliminates chain lash without any danger of over-stressing the gearbox output shaft bearings, and reduces overall stress on the gearbox assembly.

Although lighter in overall weight, the engine/gearbox arrangement has some inherent disadvantages. Mounting the clutch assembly on the crankshaft means the clutch rotates approximately three times faster than is typical, and the concentric location of the front drive sprocket and swingarm pivot means that the routine task of front drive sprocket replacement requires removal of the rear swingarm.

All G450Xs were supplied to customers with a 15-tooth front drive sprocket installed as standard. 2010 models were supplied with additional 13-tooth and 14-tooth drive sprockets.

Suspension
Although the G450X uses a fairly conventional suspension arrangement, the compact engine/gearbox assembly and concentric rear suspension arrangement allows for a longer-than-normal rear swingarm. The swingarm manipulates a high-quality Öhlins coil-over-shock strut through a lower mounting mounted above, instead of below, the swingarm. The front suspension uses upside-down 45mm Marzocchi forks.
Front and rear suspension are both fully adjustable for compression and rebound damping.

Electronics and fault diagnosis
Unlike many other BMW motorcycles manufactured during the same period, the G450X does not use CAN bus chassis management. Instead, it uses conventional wiring, switches, fuses and relays.

The G450X uses BMW Motorrad’s proprietary 10-pin round diagnostic connector. The KMS-K16 engine management system is fully OBD-II enabled, with all conventional fault-diagnostic functions. The motorcycle is compatible with BMW’s own workshop diagnostic equipment, and is also supported by the Hex Innovate GS-911 diagnostic module. The diagnostic connector is located on the left-hand main frame tube, behind and below the radiator.

Brakes
Unlike the G650GS-derived G650X Challenge, the G450X was not made available with anti-lock braking (ABS).

Warranty
The G450X was sold in the United States with BMW’s standard motorcycle warranty coverage of three years/36,000 miles, ensuring that its warranty exceeded that of any other enduro motorcycle on the market at that time.

Production
The G450X was produced between September 2008 and 2010.

Legacy
The G450X utilized technology that was considered radical by then-current enduro standards, and it failed to overcome the prejudices of buyers who expected more conventional technology. As a result, it did not meet with widespread acceptance, and its production ended after three years.

Following the end of the G450X’s production run in 2010, its engine and frame were used in three Husqvarna motorcycles from 2011 to 2014: the enduro-oriented TX449, the motocross-oriented TC449 and the rally raid-oriented TE449.

From 2010 to 2012, Husqvarna also offered an enlarged 501 cm3 version of the G450X engine in the Enduro-oriented TE511 and supermoto-oriented SMR511. Following KTM's acquisition of Husqvarna from the
BMW Group in February 2013, all G450X-derived engines were dropped from the Husqvarna range. 
 
The CCM GP450, manufactured from November 2014 until 2017, used a detuned version of the G450X engine.

References

G450X
Dual-sport motorcycles
Off-road motorcycles
Motorcycles introduced in 2008